Slivilești is a commune in Gorj County, Oltenia, Romania. It is composed of eight villages: Cojmănești, Miculești, Slivilești, Strâmtu, Sura, Șiacu, Știucani and Tehomir.

Natives
 Dumitru Carlaonț
 Ioan Carlaonț

References

Communes in Gorj County
Localities in Oltenia